Alexei Koșelev (born 19 November 1993) is a Moldovan professional footballer who plays for Super League Greece club Lamia as a goalkeeper. He is also a member of the Moldova national team.

Career

Sheriff Tiraspol
In the summer of 2015 Koșelev signed for FC Sheriff Tiraspol. In his first season he made 25 appearances in the Moldovan National Division conceding 10 goals and having 15 clean sheets. His performances helped Sheriff secure the 2015–16 and the 2016–17 Moldovan National Division.

Fortuna Sittard
In July 2018, Koșelev moved to Dutch club Fortuna Sittard, signing on a three-year deal. He made his league debut for the club on 11 August 2018 in a 1–1 away draw with Excelsior, playing all ninety minutes of the match.

International career
Koșelev made 18 appearances for the Moldova national under-21 team. He was a standout player during the 2015 European U-21 qualification campaign, having six clean sheets in 10 qualifying games.

In 2015, he made his senior debut for the Moldova national team in a qualifying match against Russia.

Honours
Sheriff Tiraspol
Moldovan National Division: 2015–16, 2016–17
Moldovan Cup: 2016–17
Moldovan Super Cup: 2015, 2016

References

External links
 
 

Living people
1993 births
Association football goalkeepers
Moldova international footballers
Moldovan footballers
FC Kuban Krasnodar players
Moldovan Super Liga players
FC Saxan players
FC Tiraspol players
FC Sheriff Tiraspol players
Liga I players
FC Politehnica Iași (2010) players
Eredivisie players
J2 League players
Fortuna Sittard players
Júbilo Iwata players
Moldovan expatriate footballers
Moldovan expatriate sportspeople in Russia
Expatriate footballers in Russia
Moldovan expatriate sportspeople in Romania
Expatriate footballers in Romania
Moldovan expatriate sportspeople in the Netherlands
Expatriate footballers in the Netherlands
Moldovan expatriate sportspeople in Japan
Expatriate footballers in Japan